"Hate Me" is a song by English singer-songwriter Ellie Goulding and American rapper and singer Juice Wrld, released as a single on 26 June 2019 through Polydor Records. It was premiered by Zane Lowe as his Beats 1's "World Record" on Beats 1 on 26 June. It was included on Goulding's fourth studio album, Brightest Blue (2020).

Promotion
On 23 June, Goulding posted a short clip on Instagram with audio of herself harmonising set to video of a chain featuring the initials "EG" and "JW", and announced the release date. Around the same time, the pre-order link for "Hate Me" became active. Goulding officially announced the title and collaboration with Juice Wrld on 24 June.

Critical reception
Carl Lamarre of Billboard called the track an "anti-love anthem" that "finds Goulding taking a darker approach, after watching her relationship spiral". Mike Wass of Idolator felt the song is a "hip-hop-flavored banger". Jael Goldfine from Paper wrote that the song is a "moody, masochistic, tongue-in-cheek new collaboration" as Goulding "dares an ex to say all the mean, ugly things broken-hearted people say to each other".

Chart performance
The song debuted at number 82 on the Billboard Hot 100 becoming Goulding's 14th entry on the chart making her the British female artist with the most entries on the chart surpassing Adele. The next week the song moved to number 74 and 
peaked number 72 in its original run. Following a rise in popularity on the social media site TikTok, "Hate Me" re-entered the Hot 100 at number 69 in late October, and has since peaked at number 56.

Music video
The music video was premiered on YouTube on 17 July 2019.

Track listing

Charts

Weekly charts

Year-end charts

Certifications

Release history

References

External links
 
 

2019 singles
2019 songs
Ellie Goulding songs
Juice Wrld songs
Songs about heartache
Songs about loneliness
Song recordings produced by Jason Evigan
Song recordings produced by the Monsters & Strangerz
Songs written by Andrew Watt (record producer)
Songs written by Ellie Goulding
Songs written by Jason Evigan
Songs written by Jordan Johnson (songwriter)
Songs written by Juice Wrld
Songs written by Marcus Lomax
Songs written by Starrah
Songs written by Stefan Johnson